The highest-selling albums and EPs in the United States are ranked in the Billboard 200, published by Billboard magazine. The data are compiled by Nielsen Soundscan based on each album's weekly discrete and download sales.

Chart history

See also
 2003 in music

References

United States Albums
2003